ZGB may refer to:

 Swiss Civil Code
 Zabergäu-Gymnasium Brackenheim, school in Germany
 The Ziff–Gulari–Barshad model in chemical physics for the catalytic oxidation of carbon monoxide